Young People's Symphony Orchestra (YPSO) is a youth orchestra located in Berkeley, California. It is the oldest youth orchestra in California and the second oldest in the United States. The youth orchestra performs concerts throughout the San Francisco Bay Area. In addition, the Orchestra is offered as a college class from Laney College.

History

The Young People's Symphony Orchestra (YPSO) has a long history. The orchestra was founded 80 years ago in 1936. Since its existence, the youth orchestra has performed in many notable locations such as Carnegie Hall in New York City, the Dean Lesher Regional Center for the Arts in Walnut Creek, California, and the International Kiwanis Convention,

Location 
The Orchestra originally had rehearsals in the Crowden School in UC Berkeley. Starting in 2015, the orchestra relocated to the First Congregational Church of Oakland, which occurred as a result of an ended agreement.

Tours

United Kingdom Tour 2016 
In the 2015-2016 season, YPSO toured the United Kingdom, specifically in London and Coventry. In Coventry, the Orchestra had a residential at the University of Warwick. They performed Carmina Burana at Coventry Cathedral with the Warwick Chorus, Symphonic Dances and Overture to Candide and Crown Imperial with the Warwick Orchestra at Butterworth Hall at the Warwick Arts Centre. In London, the Orchestra played Enigma Variations in St John's, Smith Square.

References

Culture of Berkeley, California
American youth orchestras
Music of the San Francisco Bay Area
Musical groups established in 1936
Orchestras based in California